Grace Theological Journal (GTJ) was a peer-reviewed academic journal published by Grace Theological Seminary. It contained articles of theological interest, the majority of which were written by the faculty of the seminary. It was abstracted and indexed in the ATLA Religion Database.

The founding editor-in-chief was John C. Whitcomb; towards the end of its run the journal was edited by John J. Davis.

References 

Publications established in 1980
Publications disestablished in 1991
Biannual journals
Protestant studies journals
English-language journals